Almirante Williams is the name that has been given to several ships belonging to the Chilean Navy.  They are named after Chilean Admiral Juan Williams Rebolledo (1825–1910).

 Chilean destroyer Almirante Williams (1920), ex-HMS Botha, an Almirante Lynch-class destroyer, commissioned 1920, decommissioned 1933
 Chilean frigate Almirante Williams (FF-19), ex-HMS Sheffield, a Type 22 frigate, commissioned 2003, in active service

Chilean Navy ship names